Piano Sonata No. 10 may refer to: 
Piano Sonata No. 10 (Beethoven), by Ludwig van Beethoven
Piano Sonata No. 10 (Mozart), by Wolfgang Amadeus Mozart 
Piano Sonata No. 10 (Scriabin), by Alexander Scriabin 
Piano Sonata No. 10 (Prokofiev), by Sergei Prokofiev